

Biography 

Fatou Jeng is a youth climate activist from the Gambia, focused on education, conservation and planting trees. In March 2023, the United Nations' Secretary-General announced Fatou and 6 others as members of his Youth Advisory Group on Climate Change to provide him with practical and outcome-focused advice, diverse youth perspectives and concrete recommendations, with a clear focus on accelerating the implementation of his climate action agenda.  She is internationally recognized as an organizer of youth climate action in the country, including hosting the National Youth Conference on Climate Change, country coordinator and global board member for Plant-for-the-Planet, and a Friday for Future organizer. She also has served as a moderator, speaker, and resource person for several national and international programs on climate change including COP23 and COP24, the Global Landscapes Forum's 2018 Bonn conference, Action for Climate Empowerment Youth Forum 2018, and many more international engagements.

Jeng also founded the youth lead and non-profit organization Clean Earth Gambia. The goal of the organization is to create awareness about issues concerning the environment, most importantly climate change.  As well as work to teach and train more than 500 school children about climate change as well as environmental issues to local communities.

In 2019, for the first ever UNFCC YOUNGO, the youth delegation to the Climate Negotiations, she was one of thirty people selected. At the United Nations convention she was a driving force for policy submission on gender and climate change as well as the policy operation lead for Women and Gender.  Also in 2019, she helped facilitate youth engagement during Africa Climate week.

She was the QTV Youth Dialogue Gambian Youth of the Month in June 2019 for her climate change advocacy, and described by Whatson Gambia as one of the 30 most influential young Gambians. The UN Country Office in her home country, the Gambia described her as a "trailblazing youth climate activist and a driving force for policy submissions on gender and climate change"

"Women play fundamental roles in local food systems and are carers and activists, which make them uniquely placed to drive longer term climate resilience." Fatou's advocacy for gender inclusion in climate action was pivotal to UK £165 million funding to advance gender equality in climate action, which COP27's President Alok Sharma announced in November 2021. 

In 2021, She was recognized as one of the Top 100 Young African Conservation Leaders by the African Alliance of YMCAs, the African Wildlife Fund, and a collection of many more international non-profit organizations. She has been featured in interviews by the UNFCCC, BBC, DW

Personal Life 
Jeng was a student at the University of the Gambia, and was the first female president of the university's student union.  And graduated from the University of Sussex where she obtained a master's degree in environment, development, and policy.   

She is married to Adama Njie and together they have a son, Muhammed A. Njie.

References 

Gambian activists
Climate activists
Year of birth missing (living people)
Living people
University of the Gambia alumni
Youth climate activists